Annie Christitch (1885 – 1977) was a Serbian journalist, patriot and women's rights activist.

Early life and education
Annie Christitch was born to Elizabeth O'Brien and Colonel Ljubomir N. Christitch (also written Hristić) in Belgrade in 1885. Christitch was mostly educated at home with her sister Janie and brother Nikola. She went on to get a B.A. from London University. She spoke English, French, Italian, German, Serb, Croat, Russian, and Irish fluently.

Career
She worked as lady-in-waiting to Queen Maria of Yugoslavia. Along with her mother, Christitch worked as a nurse during the First World War. She treated Serbian soldiers and supervised several military hospitals. Christitch raised money for medical supplies with a lecture tour in Britain and ran a soup kitchen for the Red Cross. During the Second World War, Christitch was part of an underground to help allied soldiers escape from Balkan countries. She also worked with the British Red Cross supported by the Queen to supply Yugoslav prisoners of war held in Germany and Italy. 

Christitch was also a journalist and reported for the Daily Express. She was one of the first women reporters to report using an airplane. Christitch worked to improve the rights of women in the Balkans and was a founding member of the Catholic Women's Suffrage Society. She was given a papal blessing for her work by Pope Benedict XV in 1919. Christitch served on the Press Committee of the International Council of Women from 1838 to 1947. Christitch died in London in 1977.

Awards
Christitch was awarded the Order of the White Eagle and the Order of St. Sava, The Yugoslavian Red Cross medal and the Czechoslovak White Lion.

References

1885 births
1977 deaths
Writers from Belgrade
20th-century Serbian women writers
Ladies-in-waiting
Serbian emigrants to the United Kingdom
Serbian courtiers